Altalariq Erfa Aqsal Ballah (born 30 December 2000) is an Indonesian professional footballer who plays as a left back or left winger for Liga 1 club Persebaya Surabaya.

Club career

Persita Tangerang
He was signed for Persita Tangerang to play in Liga 1 in the 2021 season. Ballah made his first-team debut on 28 August 2021 as a substitute in a match against Persipura Jayapura at the Pakansari Stadium, Cibinong.

Persebaya Surabaya
Ballah was signed for Persebaya Surabaya to play in Liga 1 in the 2022–23 season. He made his league debut on 7 August 2022 in a match against Bhayangkara at the Wibawa Mukti Stadium, Cikarang.

On 3 February 2023, he scored his first goal for Persebaya, as they won 3–2 against Borneo Samarinda.

Career statistics

Club

Notes

Personal life
Altalariq is the son of a former player Persita Tangerang, Anthony Jomah Ballah and Indonesian Mother.

References

External links
 Altalariq Ballah at Soccerway

2000 births
Living people
Indonesian footballers
Indonesian people of Liberian descent
Sportspeople of Liberian descent
People from Tangerang
Sportspeople from Banten
Persita Tangerang players
Persebaya Surabaya players
Liga 1 (Indonesia) players
Association football midfielders